Fritillaria (fritillaries) is a genus of spring flowering herbaceous bulbous perennial plants in the lily family (Liliaceae). The type species, Fritillaria meleagris, was first described in Europe in 1571, while other species from the Middle East and Asia were also introduced to Europe at that time. The genus has about 130–140 species divided among eight subgenera. The flowers are usually solitary, nodding and bell-shaped with bulbs that have fleshy scales, resembling those of lilies. They are known for their large genome size and genetically are very closely related to lilies. They are native to the temperate regions of the Northern hemisphere, from the Mediterranean and North Africa through Eurasia and southwest Asia to western North America. Many are endangered due to enthusiastic picking.

The name Fritillaria is thought to refer to the checkered pattern of F. meleagris, resembling a box in which dice were carried. Fritillaries are commercially important in horticulture as ornamental garden plants and also in traditional Chinese medicine, which is also endangering some species. Fritillaria flowers have been popular subjects for artists to depict and as emblems of regions and organizations.

Description

General 
Fritillaria is a genus of perennial herbaceous bulbiferous geophytes, dying back after flowering to an underground storage bulb from which they regrow in the following year. It is characterised by nodding (pendant) flowers, perianths campanulate (bell- or cup-shaped) with erect segments in upper part, a nectarial pit, groove or pouch at the base of the tepal, anthers usually pseudobasifixed, rarely versatile, fruit sometimes winged, embryo minute.

Specific

Vegetative 

 Bulbs
The bulbs are typically tunicate, consisting of a few tightly packed fleshy scales with a translucent tunic that disappears with further growth of the bulb. However, some species (F. imperialis, F. persica) have naked bulbs with many scales and loosely attached bulbils, resembling those of the closely related Lilium, although F. persica has only a single scale.

 Stems and leaves
The stems have few or many cauline leaves (arising from the stem) that are opposite on the stem or verticillate (arranged in whorls), sometimes with a cirrhose apex (ending in a tendril).

Reproductive 

 Inflorescence and flowers
The inflorescence bears flowers that are often solitary and nodding, but some form umbels or have racemes with many flowers. The flowers are usually actinomorphic (radially symmetric), but weakly zygomorphic (single plane of symmetry) in F. gibbosa and F. ariana. The campanulate perianth has six tepals, in two free whorls of three (trimerous), white, yellow, green, purple or reddish. The erect segments usually tesselated with squares of alternating light and dark colours. While the tepals are usually the same size in both whorls, in F. pallidiflora, the outer tepals are wider. The tepals have nectarial pits, grooves (F. sewerzowii) or pouches at their base. In F. persica the nectarial pouch is developed into a short spur. The perigonal nectaries are large and well developed, and in most species (with the exception of subgenus Rhinopetalum), are linear to lanceolate or ovate and weakly impressed upon the tepals.

 Gynoecium
The flowers are bisexual, containing both male (androecium) and female (gynoecium) characteristics. The pistil has three carpels (tricarpellary). The ovaries are hypogynous (superior, that is attached above the other floral parts). The ovule is anatropous in orientation and has two integuments (bitegmic), the micropyle (opening) being formed from the inner integument, while the nucellus is small. The embryo sac or megagametophyte is tetrasporic, in which all four megaspores survive. The style is trilobate to trifid (in 3 parts) and the surface of the stigma is wet.

 Androecium 
Stamens are six, in two trimerous whorls of three, and diplostemonous (outer whorl of stamens opposite outer tepals and the inner whorl opposite inner tepals). Filaments filiform or slightly flattened, but sometimes papillose and rarely hairy (F. karelinii). Anthers are linear to ellipsoid, but rarely subglobose (F. persica) in shape, and their attachment to the filament is usually pseudobasifixed (connective tissue extends in a tube around the filament tip), rarely attached at the centre and free (dorsifixed versatile; F. fusca and some Liliorhiza species). In contrast, pseudobasifixed anthers can not move freely. The pollen grains are spheroidal and reticulate (net like pattern), with individual brochi (lumina within reticulations) of 4–5 μm.

 Fruit and seeds
The capsule is obovoid to globose, loculicidal and six-angled, sometimes with wings. The seeds are flattened with a marginal wing, the seed coat made out of both integuments, but the testa is thin and the endosperm lacks starch. The embryo is small.

Phytochemistry 

Fritillaria, like other members of the family Liliaceae, contain flavonol glycosides and tri- and diferulic-acid sucrose esters, steroidal alkaloids, saponins and terpenoids that have formed the active ingredients in traditional medicine (see Traditional medicine). Certain species have flowers that emit disagreeable odors that have been referred to as phenolic, putrid, sulfurous, sweaty and skunky. The scent of Fritillaria imperialis has been called "rather nasty", while that of F. agrestis, known commonly as stink bells, is reminiscent of canine feces. On the other hand, F. striata has a sweet fragrance. The "foxy" odor of F. imperialis has been identified as 3-methyl-2-butene-1-thiol (dimethylallyl mercaptan), an alkylthiol.

Genome 

Fritillaria represents the most extreme case of genome size expansion in angiosperms. Polyploidy is rare, with nearly all species being diploid and only occasional reports of triploidy. Reported genome size in Fritillaria vary from 1Cx (DNA content of unreplicated haploid chromosome complement) values of 30.15 to 85.38 Gb (Giga base pairs), that is > 190 times that of Arabidopsis thaliana, which has been called the "model plant" and > 860 times that of Genlisea aurea, which represents the smallest land plant genome sequenced to date. Giant genome size is generally defined as >35 pg (34 Gb). The largest genomes in diploid Fritillaria are found in subgenus Japonica, exceeding 85 Gb. At least one species, tetraploid F. assyriaca, has a very large genome. With approximately 127 pg (130 Gb), it was for a long time the largest known genome, exceeding the largest vertebrate animal genome known to date, that of the marbled lungfish (Protopterus aethiopicus), in size. Heterochromatin levels vary by biogeographic region, with very little in Old World and abundant levels in New World species. Most species have a basic chromosome number of x=12, but x=9, 11 and 13 have been reported.

Taxonomy

History

Pre-Linnaean 

Gerard (1597) states that Fritillaria was unknown to the ancients, but certainly it was appearing in the writings of sixteenth century European botanists, including Dodoens (1574, 1583), Lobelius (1576, 1581), and Clusius (1583) in addition to Gerard, and was mentioned by Shakespeare and other authors of the period (see Culture). Species of Fritillaria were known in Persia (Iran) in the sixteenth century, from where they were taken to Turkey. European travelers then brought back specimens together with many other exotic eastern plants to the developing botanical gardens of Europe. By the middle of the sixteenth century there was already a flourishing export trade of various bulbs from Turkey to Europe. In Persia, the first mention in the literature was by Hakim Mo'men Tonekabon in his Tohfe Al-Mo'menin in 1080 AH ( AD), who described the medicinal properties of F. imperialis (laleh sarnegoun).

European fritillaries had recently been documented in the wild amongst the Loire meadows in 1570 by Noël Capperon, an Orléans apothecary, and which he had mentioned to Clusius in correspondence in 1571, and sent him a specimen of these F. meleagris. He also corresponded with Dodoens. Capperon had suggested the name Fritillaria to Clusius, rather than the vernacular variegated lily (Lilium ou bulbum variegatum). He stated that the flower was known locally as Fritillaria because of a resemblance to the board used in playing checkers. In recognition of this, the botanical authority is sometimes written Fritillaria (Caperon) L.

The first account in a botanical text is by Dodoens in his Purgantium (1574) and in more detail in Stirpium (1583). In the Purgantium, Dodoens describes and illustrates F. meleagris as Meleagris flos, without mentioning Capperon. He was also aware, through having been sent a picture, of F. imperialis, and decided to include it as well, without making a connection. His term for F. imperialis was Corona imperialis.

Consequently, Lobelius, in his Plantarum (1576), gives Dodoens the credit for describing F. meleagris. He used the word "Fritillaria" for the first time, describing F. meleagris, which he considered to belong to the Lilio-Narcissus plants, including tulips. The term Lilio-Narcissus refers to an appearance of having lily-like flowers, but a narcissus-like bulb. He called it Fritillaria (synonyms Lilio-Narcissus purpurens variegatus or Meleagris flos Dodonaei). Lobelius also included amongst the lilies, but not as Fritillaria, Corona imperialis which he mentions originated in Turkey and added what he referred to as Lilium persicum (Fritillaria persica). In his later vernacular Kruydtboeck (1581) he described two species he considered related, Fritillaria Lilio-Narcissus purpurens variegatus and Lilio-Narcissus variegatus atropurpureus Xanctonicus. He acknowledged that the plant had originally been found near Orleans and then sent to the Netherlands. Fritillaria is ook een soort van lelie narcis die de oorsprong heeft uit het land van Orléans van waar dat ze gebracht is in Nederland. In his own language he referred to it as Fritillaria of heel bruin gespikkelde Lelie-Narcisse. He also included Corona imperialis and Lilium persicum as before.

Dodoens had proposed the name Meleagris flos or Guinea-fowl flower, for what we now know as Fritillaria meleagris, after a resemblance to that bird's spotted plumage, then known as Meleagris avis. In the seventeenth century, John Parkinson provided an account of twelve species of what he referred to as Fritillaria - the checkered daffodil, in his Paradisus (1635), correctly placing it as closest to the lilies. He provides his version of Capperon's discovery, and suggests that some feel he should be honoured with the name Narcissus Caparonium. Often when these exotic new plants entered the English language literature they lacked common names in the language. While Henry Lyte can only describe F. meleagris as Flos meleagris, Fritillaria or lilionarcissus, it appears that it was Shakespeare who applied the common name of "chequered".

Although Clausius had corresponded with Capperon in 1571, he did not publish his account of European flora (other than Spain) till his Rariorum Pannoniam of 1583, where he gives an account of Capperon's discovery, noting the names, Fritillaria, Meleagris and Lilium variegatum. However he did not consider F. imperialis or F. persica to be related, calling both of them Lilium, Lilium persicum and Lilium susianum respectively.

Post-Linnaean 

Although the first formal description is attributed to Joseph Pitton de Tournefort in 1694, by convention, the first valid formal description is by Linnaeus, in his Species Plantarum (1753),. Therefore, the botanical authority is given as Tourn. ex L.. Linnaeus identified five known species of Fritillaria, and grouped them in his Hexandria Monogynia (six stamens+one pistil), his system being based on sexual characteristics. These characteristics defined the core group of the family Liliaceae for a long time. Linnaeus' original species were F. imperialis, F. regia (now Eucomis regia), F. persica, F. pyrenaica and F. meleagris. The family Liliaceae was first described by Michel Adanson in 1763, placing Fritillaria in section Lilia of that family, but also considering Imperialis as a separate genus to Fritillaria, together with five other genera. The formal description of the family is attributed to Antoine Laurent de Jussieu in 1789, who included eight genera, including Imperialis, in his Lilia.

Although the circumscription of Liliaceae and its subdivisions have undergone considerable revision over the ensuing centuries, the close relationship between Fritillaria and Lilium the type genus of the family, have ensured that the former has remained part of the core group, which constitutes the modern much-reduced family. For instance, Bentham and Hooker (1883), placed Fritillaria and Lilium in Liliaceae tribe Tulipeae, together with five other genera.

Phylogeny 

Fritillaria is generally considered a monophyletic genus, placed within the tribe Lilieae s.s., where it is a sister group to Lilium and the largest member of that tribe. The evolutionary and phylogenetic relationships between the genera currently included in Liliaceae are shown in the following Cladogram:

More recently, some larger phylogenetic studies of Lilieae, Lilium and Fritillaria have suggested that Fritillaria may actually consist of two distinct biogeographical clades (A and B), and that these are in a polytomous relationship with Lilium. This could mean that Fritillaria is actually two distinct genera, suggesting that the exact relationship is not yet fully resolved.

Subdivision 

The large number of species have traditionally been divided into a number of subgroupings. By 1828, Duby in his treatment of the flora of France, recognized two subgroups, which he called section Meleagris and section Petilium. By 1874, Baker had divided 55 species into ten subgenera:

In the 1880s, both Bentham and Hooker (1883) and Boissier (1884) independently simplified this by reducing nine of these subgenera to five, which they treated as sections rather than subgenera. Bentham and Hooker, who recognized more than 50 species, transferred the tenth of Baker's subgenera, Notholirion to Lilium. Boissier, by contrast, in his detailed account of oriental species, recognized Notholirion as a separate genus, whose status has been maintained since (see cladogram). He also divided Eufritillaria into subsections.

In the post-Darwinian era, Komarov (1935) similarly segregated Rhinopetalum and Korolkowia as separate genera, but Turrill and Sealy (1980) more closely followed Boissier, but further divided Eufritillaria and placed all American species in Liliorhiza. However, the best known and cited of these classification schemes based on plant morphology is that of Martyn Rix, produced by the Fritillaria Group of the Alpine Garden Society in 2001. This listed 165 taxa grouped into 6 subgenera, 130 species, 17 subspecies, and 9 varieties. Rix, who described eight subgenera in all, restored both Rhinopetalum and Korolkowia as subgenera. He also used series to further subdivide subgenera, kept Boissier's four sections, renamed Eufritillaria as Fritillaria, and added subgenera Davidii and Japonica. The largest of these is Fritillaria, while Theresia, Korolkowia and Davidii are monotypic (containing a single species).

Baker based his classification on the characteristics of the bulb, style, nectary and capsule valves. The large nectaries of Fritillaria have been the focus of much of the morphological classification, while the distinct form of the nectaries in Rhinopetalum were the basis for considering it a separate genus.

Molecular phylogenetics 

The development of molecular phylogenetics and cladistic analysis has allowed a better understanding of the infrageneric relationships of Fritillaria species. Initial studies showed the major infrageneric split to be by biogeographic region into two clades, North America (clade A) and Eurasia (clade B). Clade A corresponded most closely with subgenus Liliorhiza.

A subsequent study by Rønsted and colleagues (2005), using an expanded pool of taxa of 37 species including all of Rix's subgenera and sections, confirmed the initial split on the basis of geography and supported the broad division of the genus into Rix's eight subgenera but not the deeper relationships (sections and series). Clade A corresponds with subgenus Liliorhiza centred in California, but a number of species (F. camschatcensis - Japan and Siberia), F. maximowiczii and F. dagana - Russia) are also found in Western Asia. These Asian species form a grade with the true North American species, suggesting an origin in Asia followed by later dispersal. Of clade B, the Eurasian species, the largest subgenus, Fritillaria, appeared to be polyphyletic in that F. pallidiflora appeared to segregate in subclade B1, with subgenera Petillium, Korolkowia and Theresia while all other species formed a clade within B2.

The phylogenetic, evolutionary and biogeographical relationships between the subgenera are shown in this cladogram:

The number of taxa sampled was subsequently enlarged to 92 species (66% of all species), and all species in each subgenus except Rhinopetalum (80%), Liliorhiza and Fritillaria (60%). This expanded study further resolved the evolutionary relationships between the subgenera but also confirmed the polyphyletic nature of subgenus Fritillaria as shown in the following cladogram. The majority of taxa within this subgenus (Fritillaria 2) form a subclade centred in Europe, the Middle East and North Africa, but with some species ranging into China. The remainder (Fritillaria 1), being centred in China and Central Asia, but with some species ranging into North and South Asia. This group is therefore probably a separate subgenus.

Subgenera

Species 
 
The genus Fritillaria includes about 150 subordinate taxa, including species and subspecies. Estimates of the number of species vary from about 100 through 130–140. The Plant List (2013) includes 141 accepted species names, and 156 taxa in total.

Biogeography and evolution 

It is likely that two invasions across the Bering Straits to North America took place within the Lileae, one in each genus, Lilium and Fritillaria. Within the Eurasian clade, the two subclades differ in bulb type. In subclade B2 (Fritillaria, Rhinopetalum, and Japonica), the bulb type is described as Fritillaria-type, with 2–3 fleshy scales and the tunica derived from the remnants of previous year's scales. by contrast subclade B2 (Petilium, Theresia and Korolkowia) differ. Those of Theresia and Korolkowia are large, consisting of a single large fleshy scale, while Petilium species have several large erect imbricate scales. In Liliorhiza the bulbs are naked and have numerous scales similar to Lilium, but with numerous "rice-grain bulbils". The location of the bulbils differ from the more common aerial pattern of arising from within the axil of a leaf or inflorescence, as in Lilium and Allium. Similar bulbils are also found in Davidii. These bulbils arise in the axils of the scale leaves. Bulbils confer an evolutionary advantage in vegetative propagation.

Etymology 

When Noël Capperon, an Orléans apothecary, discovered F. meleagris growing in the Loire meadows in 1570, he wrote to Carolus Clusius, describing it, and saying that it was known locally as fritillaria, supposedly because the checkered pattern on the flower resembled the board on which checkers was played. Clusius believed this to be an error, in that  is actually the Latin name for the box in which the dice used in the game were kept, not the board itself.

Some North American species are called "mission bells".

Distribution and habitat 

Fritillaria are distributed in most temperate zone of the Northern Hemisphere, from western North America, through Europe, the Mediterranean, Middle East and Central Asia to China and Japan. Centres of diversity include Turkey (39 species) and the Zagros Mountains of Iran (14–15 species). Iran is also the centre of diversity of species such as F. imperialis and F. persica. There are five areas of particularly active evolution and clustering of species - California, Mediterranean Greece and Turkey, Anatolia and the Zagros mountains, central Asia from Uzbekistan to western Xinjiang and the eastern Himalayas in southwestern China. Fritillaria species are found in a wide variety of climatic regions and habitats, but about half of them show a preference for full sun in open habitats.

A number of Fritillaria are widely introduced. Cultivated fritillaries (F. meleagris) have been recorded in British gardens since 1578, but only in the wild since 1736, it is likely to be introduced, rather than be endemic. It is greatly diminished there due to loss of habitat, although persistent along the River Thames in Oxfordshire. F. imperialis was introduced into Europe around the 1570s, with Ulisse Aldrovandi sending a drawing to Francesco de' Medici in Florence, famed for his gardens at Villa di Pratolino in 1578. His friend Jacopo Ligozzi (1547–1627) was also including it in his paintings, as well as F. persica. In Britain, F. imperialis was first seen in the London garden of James Nasmyth, surgeon to King James I in April 1605.

Ecology

The majority of species are spring-flowering. Lily beetles (scarlet lily beetle, Lilioceris lilii and Lilioceris chodjaii) feed on fritillaries, and may become a pest where these plants are grown in gardens or commercially.

Fritillaria are entomophilous (insect pollinated). Those species with large nectaries (4–12 x 1–4 mm) and have more fructose than glucose in the nectar are most commonly pollinated by wasps, while those with smaller nectaries (2–10 x 1–2 mm) and a more balanced nectar composition are most commonly pollinated by bumblebees.

Conservation 

A number of species of Fritillaria are endangered, from over-harvesting, habitat fragmentation, over-grazing and international demand for herbals. These include many species in Greece, and Fritillaria gentneri in the pacific Northwest of North America. In Japan, five of the eight endemic species (subgenus Japonica) are listed as endangered. In China, the collection of Fritillaria bulbs to make traditional medicine, particularly F. cirrhosa from southwest China and the eastern Himalayas of Bhutan and Nepal and one of the most intensively harvested of the alpine medicinal plants threatens extinction.

In Iran, F. imperialis and F. persica are endangered and F. imperialis is protected. The genus is threatened by irregular grazing, change in pasture usage, pest (primarily Lilioceris chodjaii) migration from pasture destruction, and harvesting by poor people for sale to florists.

One species, F. delavayi, has begun to grow brown, greyish flowers to better camouflage amongst the rock of its habitat. Scientists believe it is evolving to combat its biggest predator — humans. Over-picking has greatly decreased the availability of this species in China and even though there is no known difference between the flowers picked in the wild and those grown commercially, hunters continue to believe the wild flowers offer better medicinal benefit.

Toxicity 

Most fritillaries contain poisonous steroidal alkaloids such as imperialin in the bulbs and some may even be deadly if ingested in quantity.

Uses

The bulbs of a few species, such as F. affinis, F. camschatcensis, and F. pudica, are edible if prepared carefully. They were commonly eaten by indigenous peoples of the Pacific Northwest coast of North America. The wild species flowering in areas such as Iran have become important for ecotourism, when in late May people come to the Valley of Roses, near Chelgerd, to see F. imperialis blooming. The area is also rich in F. reuteri and F. gibbosa.
 Because of their large genome size, Fritillaria species are an important source for genomic studies of the processes involved in genome size diversity and evolution. They also have important commercial value both in horticulture and traditional medicine.

Horticulture 

Species of Fritillaria are becoming increasingly popular as ornamental garden plants, and many species and cultivars are commercially available. They are usually grown from dormant bulbs planted in Autumn. As perennials they repeat flower every year, and some species will increase naturally. While Fritillaria is mainly harvested from the wild fields for commercial use, the growing price of the herbal product results in over-exploitation and puts the species at risk of depletion.

The following may be most commonly found in cultivation:-

Fritillaria acmopetala - pointed-petal fritillary
Fritillaria imperialis - crown imperial
Fritillaria meleagris - snake's head fritillary
Fritillaria pallidiflora - Siberian fritillary
Fritillaria persica - Persian fritillary
Fritillaria pyrenaica - Pyrenean fritillary

Traditional medicine 

Species of Fritillaria have been used in traditional medicine in China for over 2,000 years, and are one of the most widely used medicines today. The production of medicines from F. cirrhosa is worth US$400 million per annum. Although some are cultivated for this purpose, most are gathered in the wild. In recent years demand has increased leading to over-harvesting of wild populations. In addition to China, Fritillaria products are used medicinally in the Himalayas, including India, Nepal and Pakistan, as well as Japan, Korea and Southeast Asia. To meet the demand additional countries such as Turkey and Burma are involved in the collection. The products are used mainly as antitussives, expectorants, and antihypertensives. The active ingredients are thought to be isosteroidal and steroidal alkaloid compounds. Chinese sources suggest 16 species as source material, but this may be an overestimate due to the large number of synonyms in Chinese. Of these, 15 are in subgenus Fritillaria (both subclades), but one (F. anhuiensis) is in subgenus Liliorhiza. F. imperialis also has a long history of medicinal usage in China and Iran.

Fritillaria extracts (fritillaria in English, bulbus fritillariae cirrhosae in Latin) are used in traditional Chinese medicine under the name  (literally "Shell mother from Sichuan", or just ). Species such as F. cirrhosa, F. thunbergii and F. verticillata are used in cough remedies. They are listed as chuān bèi or zhè bèi (Chinese: 浙貝/浙贝), respectively, and are often in formulations combined with extracts of loquat (Eriobotrya japonica). Fritillaria verticillata bulbs are also traded as bèi mǔ or, in Kampō, baimo (Chinese/Kanji: 貝母, Katakana: バイモ). In one study fritillaria reduced airway inflammation by suppressing cytokines, histamines, and other compounds of inflammatory response.

Popular culture 

Shakespeare, Matthew Arnold and George Herbert and more recently Vita Sackville-West (The Land 1927) wrote romantically about fritillaries. Fritillaries were also a favourite of the Dutch flower painters that emerged around 1600, such as Ambrosius Bosschaert and Jacob de Gheyn II, and appeared in Italian art, such as that of Jacopo Ligozzi in the late sixteenth century.

Fritillaries are commonly used as floral emblems. F. meleagris (snake's head fritillary) is the county flower of Oxfordshire, UK, and the provincial flower of Uppland, Sweden, where it is known as kungsängslilja ("Kungsängen lily"). In Germany, F. meleagris appears as a heraldic device in a number of municipalities, such as Hetlingen, Seestermühe and Winseldorf, and also in Austria (Großsteinbach).

In Croatia this species is known as kockavica (from), and the checkerboard pattern of its flowers may have inspired the checkerboard pattern on the nation's coat of arms. F. camschatcensis (Kamchatka fritillary) is the floral emblem of Ishikawa Prefecture and Obihiro City in Japan. Its Japanese name is kuroyuri (クロユリ), meaning "dark lily". Fritillaria montana is the floral emblem of Giardino Botanico Alpino di Pietra Corva, a botanical garden in Italy.

See also 

 Taxonomy of Liliaceae
 History of botany

Notes

References

Bibliography

Books and theses 

 
 
 
 
 
 , see also The Jepson Manual
 
  
 
 
  
 
 
 
 
  see also Flora Europaea

Historical sources (chronological) 

 
 
 
 
 
 

 
 , trans. as
 
 , see also Species Plantarum

Fritillaria in culture

Chapters 

 , in 
 , in 

Articles

Regional

Traditional medicine and pharmacology

Subgenera

Species

Documents

Websites 

 
 
 
 
 
 
 see also 
 
 
 
 
 

 Botanic gardens and herbaria
 
 
 
 
 
  see also Giardino Botanico Alpino di Pietra Corva

 Databases
 
 
 , see also Angiosperm Phylogeny Website
 
 
 
 
 
 

 Flora
 
 

 Organisations
 
 
 

 Posters

External links 

 
Liliaceae genera
Taxa named by Joseph Pitton de Tournefort